Dirty is the seventh full-length studio album and second double album by American rock band Sonic Youth, released on July 21, 1992 by DGC Records. The band recorded and co-produced the album with Butch Vig in early 1992 at the Magic Shop studios. The sound on Dirty was inspired by the popularity of grunge music at the time, and has been described by Billboard magazine as avant-rock. Some songs on the album mark the first appearance of three guitars in a few Sonic Youth songs.

Dirty reached number 83 on the US Billboard 200 and number six on the UK Albums Chart. The album spawned four singles: the lead single "100%" charted well, but was not the crossover hit the label anticipated, followed by "Youth Against Fascism", which did not chart as well. The last two were "Sugar Kane" and "Drunken Butterfly", with the former performing better commercially than the latter. In support of the album, Sonic Youth embarked on the "Pretty Fucking Dirty" tour of 1992 and 1993, where they played most of the album during sets. In late 1992, they toured North America, and in early 1993, they toured New Zealand and Australia and released the Whores Moaning EP, which featured most of the "Sugar Kane" B-sides.

Background 

Following the release of Daydream Nation in 1988, Sonic Youth were interested in signing with a new record label. By the middle of 1989, the top contenders for the band's new label were A&M Records, Atlantic Records and Mute Records. Between late 1989 and early 1990, Geffen Records announced its interest in signing the band. Sonic Youth eventually signed a five-album deal with Geffen for an estimated $300,000. However, the band was disappointed when they discovered that the albums would be released on the newly created Geffen sub-label, DGC Records.

In 1990, the band released Goo, which achieved moderate commercial success, peaking at No. 96 on the Billboard 200 in the United States and charting in the Netherlands, New Zealand and the United Kingdom. Critical reception to the album was positive. To support its release, Sonic Youth toured Europe and North America twice in 1990. Preceding the mainstream breakthrough of alternative rock and grunge, the band toured Europe again in late summer 1991 with Nirvana, Dinosaur Jr, Babes in Toyland and Gumball. On this tour, they premiered "Orange Rolls, Angel's Spit" and "Chapel Hill", both of which would later appear on Dirty. The latter tour was chronicled on the documentary 1991: The Year Punk Broke, directed by Dave Markey. In November, they began demoing songs on 8-track at their rehearsal space in Hoboken.

Recording 

For Dirty, Sonic Youth worked with producer Butch Vig and mixer Andy Wallace, who both had worked in the same roles on Nirvana's Nevermind, although this was not why the band chose them. On the album's sound, Pitchfork would later opine that "they weren't entirely catering to the new ears Nirvana's success was sending their way", but "were at least taking it into consideration on a semi-conscious level". During his first meeting with the group, Vig told the band that he wanted to tighten the song arrangements and focus on crafting the guitar sounds. Vig quickly landed the producer job for the record. During a visit to the apartment of Sonic Youth members Thurston Moore and Kim Gordon, Moore told Vig he wanted the album to sound like an obscure Mecht Mensch single that Vig had produced.

The band sent a series of cassette tapes to Vig in late 1991, featuring their new compositions. Vig was pleased but also uncertain, as the tapes consisted of long instrumentals, and the producer was unable to discern the song structures. The second batch of cassettes that Vig received demonstrated that the band had performed some self-editing with its compositions. Vig moved to New York City for three months in early 1992 and the band began recording the album at the Magic Shop in March. Ian MacKaye of Fugazi contributed guest guitar on "Youth Against Fascism". The last song on the album, "Crème Brûlée", was recorded when Gordon was randomly playing guitar and singing with Shelley playing the drums, while Moore was trying to turn on his amplifier and guitarist Lee Ranaldo was recording the whole thing.

After recording was completed, the album needed to be trimmed down from 18 tracks. Moore, Gordon and the band's A&R person, Gary Gersh, agreed that Ranaldo's song "Genetic" would be removed. Ranaldo did not react well to the decision; coupled with personal issues he was facing at the time, it led him to consider leaving the group. After a few weeks, the matter settled and Ranaldo stayed with the band. "Genetic" and another omitted track, Gordon's "Hendrix Necro", were instead featured on the "100%" single. Another track recorded in the sessions, "Stalker", was added to the album's vinyl release.

Lyrics and themes 
The opening song, "100%", was written about the murder of Joe Cole, a roadie and the band's friend, and how it affected many people, including Sonic Youth. The next song, "Swimsuit Issue", is about a then-current Geffen employee who was remanded to therapy for sexual harassment, hence the lyrics "Don't touch my breast, I'm just working at my desk." The last section of the song features Gordon naming all of the models in the March 1992 Sports Illustrated Swimsuit Issue. The lyrics to "Drunken Butterfly" were taken wholly from song titles and lyrics of Heart songs, and the track was originally titled "Barracuda" after a Heart song. The final title was taken from Heart song "Dog & Butterfly", which sounds a bit like "drunken butterfly". "Sugar Kane" is said to be about Marilyn Monroe. "Chapel Hill," one of the first songs written for the album along with "Orange Rolls, Angel's Spit", is about the town of Chapel Hill, North Carolina, and the 1991 murder of bookseller Bob Sheldon. "JC", like "100%", was written about Joe Cole. The song's working title was "Moonface".

Packaging 
The front cover of the album, a photograph taken by Gordon's longtime friend Mike Kelley, depicted an orange stuffed toy with Sonic Youth written down the sides. The theme continued through the CD booklet with pictures of a teddy bear, rabbit and other plush animals. The credits were also included in the booklet. The back cover featured images of individual members of the band along with the track listing. The vinyl version differed, with the back cover featuring the stuffed toys and the band photos in the inserts. Some versions of the CD have a "dirty picture" of Bob Flanagan and Sheree Rose defiling stuffed toys while naked.

Release 
Prior to the album's release, Sonic Youth did a short Northeast tour in which most of Dirty was premiered. Dirty was released on July 21, 1992 on double LP vinyl, CD and Cassette. The LP version of the album came with an extra track titled "Stalker". The album hit No. 6 in the UK Albums Chart (their highest charting album in the UK) and No. 83 in the US. In the wake of the success of Nirvana's 1991 album Nevermind, DGC pushed Dirty heavily. In the same month as the album was issued, "100%" was released as a single, but was not the crossover hit the label anticipated. Geffen executive Mark Kates admitted it "was not a great radio song"; however, the song was popular on alternative and college radio, reaching No. 4 in the Billboard Alternative Songs and No. 28 in the UK Singles Chart. In September, the band appeared on Late Night with David Letterman, performing "100%". At the urging of Kates, "Youth Against Fascism" was released in December as the album's second single. The single did not sell well or receive airplay (though it did chart at No. 52 in the UK), and Kates referred to the decision as "one of the biggest professional mistakes of my life".

In late 1992, the band began their "Pretty Fucking Dirty" tour, starting in North America. All of the songs from Dirty were played at least once, except for "Crème Brûlée". They also played "Genetic," but occasionally swapped it for "Eric's Trip" or "Mote". They changed the setlists frequently, but kept "Shoot" as the opener. In November and December, they toured Europe, also appearing on Later with Jools Holland to perform "Drunken Butterfly", "Sugar Kane" and "JC". In January and February 1993, Sonic Youth toured Australia and New Zealand, and released the "Sugar Kane" single, which performed much better than "Youth Against Fascism", reaching No. 26 in the UK Singles Chart. The same month, they released the Whores Moaning Australia-only EP to coincide with the tour. The EP included the "Sugar Kane" B-sides along with the track "Tamra". The last single from the album, "Drunken Butterfly", was released in August 1993 in Germany only.

Critical reception 

Dirty was generally well-received by critics. Entertainment Weekly praised the album, calling it "possibly the finest hour (59 minutes, actually) from this New York noise & roll band. It is also much-needed proof that the old-fangled concept of a rock guitar band can still result in vital, undeniably moving music", and ending the review with, "At this point, every other rock & roll album that visits our planet this year will have a hard time topping [Dirty]". Rolling Stone opined that Dirty "easily rank[s] with Daydream Nation and Sister" as "the band's most unified and unforgettable recorded works".

Trouser Press saw Dirty as a big improvement over Goo, which the publication saw as "failing miserably". AllMusic would later call it "a damn good rock album, and on those terms it ranks with Sonic Youth's best work".

Accolades 
Dirty was deemed the best album of 1992 by Entertainment Weekly. The album was also included in the book 1001 Albums You Must Hear Before You Die.

Music videos 
The first music video from Dirty was for "100%". It was directed by Tamra Davis and Spike Jonze, and shot in Los Angeles. Much of the video footage was shot by Jonze while riding on a skateboard, following others in the streets (including then-skateboarder, now-actor Jason Lee). The video also alluded to the shooting death of Cole, but is not specifically about him, and more about friendship between two skateboarders. Sonic Youth is shown playing a house party throughout the film. Gordon plays a yellow Fender bass guitar, which she borrowed from actor Keanu Reeves.

The second music video, for "Youth Against Fascism", was directed by Nick Egan. The video was shot in the concrete flood control channel of the Los Angeles River with the band playing while FMX bikers ride around. Imagery of fascism, Nazism and communism was spliced into the video, plus an insurrection mixed with pictures of punk bands and fashion.

The third music video was for "Sugar Kane"; like "Youth Against Fascism", it was directed by Egan. The video was shot in New York City and portrayed Sonic Youth performing in the midst of a fashion show that showcased "grunge" clothing.  The clothing, in fact, was one of the collections ("Grunge Collection") done by Marc Jacobs for Perry Ellis in 1992. Jacobs was a close friend of Gordon and the band. The video also marked the first film appearance of Chloë Sevigny.

The fourth video from Dirty was for "Drunken Butterfly", directed by Stephen Hellweg, the winner of an MTV 120 Minutes contest in which fans were asked to send in videos for any song on Dirty. It featured puppets and dolls made up to look like Sonic Youth performing the song onstage. The fifth (for "Swimsuit Issue", which featured shirtless men smoking together in a room listening to Dirty) and sixth (for "Nic Fit", showing someone running around in a field holding up a flaming stuffed animal) videos stemmed from the same contest.

Track listing

Personnel 

Sonic Youth
 Thurston Moore – vocals, guitar, production, mixing (track 10)
 Kim Gordon – bass, vocals, guitar, production, mixing (track 10)
 Lee Ranaldo – guitar, vocals, production, mixing (track 10)
 Steve Shelley – drums, production, mixing (track 10)

Additional personnel
 Ian MacKaye – guitar (track 9)

Technical
 Butch Vig – production, engineering, mixing (track 15)
 Andy Wallace – mixing (all tracks except 10 and 15)
 Edward Douglas – engineering
 Fred Kevorkian – engineering assistance
 John Siket – mixing assistance
 Peter Beckerman – mixing assistance
 Howie Weinberg – mastering
 Mike Kelley – sleeve artwork
 Kevin Reagan – sleeve art direction
 Richard Kern – sleeve photography

Chart positions

Album

Singles

Release history

References 

Bibliography

External links 
 
 Dirty (Adobe Flash) at Radio3Net (streamed copy where licensed)

1992 albums
Albums produced by Butch Vig
Geffen Records albums
Sonic Youth albums